Bryan Voltaggio (born 1976) is an American celebrity chef, restaurateur, and author. He is a Top Chef television series alum; and he was a semi-finalist for the James Beard award. His brother is celebrity chef Michael Voltaggio. He resides in Frederick, Maryland and is known for Mid-Atlantic cuisine.

Early life and education 
Bryan Voltaggio was the oldest of three children, born to Sharon and John Voltaggio. At age 7, his parents divorced and the children initially lived with their mother, and later moved to their father's house. Starting in childhood, brothers Bryan and Michael were very close. He attended Governor Thomas Johnson High School. He is married to Jennifer Covell, whom he met in high school; and together they have children.

His first job was as a busboy at a Holiday Inn in Frederick, Maryland. He took a vocational culinary program at Frederick Community College while attending Governor Thomas Johnson High School and by age 15, he was given the role of cook.

Voltaggio received an AOS degree in culinary arts in 1999 from The Culinary Institute of America. He was mentored by chef Charlie Palmer and Gerry Hayden, while working at restaurant Aureole.

Restaurant career 
In 2003, Voltaggio worked as the head chef at Charlie Palmer Steak.

Bryan, along with brother Michael, opened STRFSH, a fast-casual fish sandwich shop in Santa Monica, open from October 2017 to 2021. The Voltaggio brother had co-owned Estuary in Washington D.C., which operated under their leadership from 2019 until March 2022.

Restaurants

Active 
 Voltaggio Brothers Steak House, MGM National Harbor, Oxon Hill (December 2016–present)
 Thacher & Rye, Frederick (2020–present)
 Showroom, Frederick (2020–present)

Closed

Television appearances
Voltaggio was the runner-up of the fifth season of Top Chef Masters, runner-up of the sixth season of Top Chef, Bravo's cooking competition show, placing second to his brother, Michael Voltaggio; and also a runner-up to Melissa King on the seventeenth season of Top Chef: All-Stars L.A. He was the first chef to compete on both Top Chef and Top Chef Masters.

By becoming the runner-up on his second season of regular Top Chef, Bryan became the only chef to compete on multiple Top Chef seasons and not be eliminated.

In 2021 to 2022, the Voltaggio brothers appeared on Guy Fieri's television series, Tournament of Champions (Food Network) on season three.

Awards, nominations and accolades
 2010 James Beard Foundation Award "Best Chef: Mid-Atlantic" Nominee
 2012 James Beard Foundation Award "Best Chef: Mid-Atlantic" Semi-finalist

Personal life
Voltaggio lives in Maryland with his wife Jennifer and their three children, Thacher, Piper, and Ever.

Publications

References

External links

Showroom Restaurant website
Thacher & Rye Restaurant website

1976 births
Chefs from Maryland
American male chefs
Culinary Institute of America alumni
Living people
Top Chef contestants
People from Frederick, Maryland